The slaty elaenia (Elaenia strepera) is a species of bird in the family Tyrannidae. It is found in the Southern Andean Yungas ; it winters in the western Amazon Basin, Colombia and Venezuela. Its natural habitat is subtropical or tropical dry forests.

References

slaty elaenia
Birds of the Southern Andean Yungas
slaty elaenia
Taxonomy articles created by Polbot